Ryali is a village in Konaseema district of the Indian state of Andhra Pradesh. It is located in Atreyapuram Mandal of Amalapuram revenue division. And it is one of the most popular tourist spots in AP

Culture 
Jagan Mohini Kesava temple - the exquisite idol, made of black stone and depicting Maha Vishnu and Mohini on its front and rear sides, is considered to be a marvel of sculptural dexterity.
The village has Uma Kamandaleswara Swamy temple.

References 

Villages in Atreyapuram mandal